is a Japanese former long-distance runner. He was a world-class marathon competitor in the 1980s. He represented his native country at the 1984 and the 1988 Summer Olympics in Seoul, South Korea.

Seko's notable marathon wins include Fukuoka Marathon (1978–1980, 1983), Boston Marathon (1981, 1987), London Marathon (1986) and Chicago Marathon (1986).

On March 22, 1981 Seko set world records at 25,000 m (1:13:55.8) and 30,000 m (1:29:18.8). The records stood for 30 years, until they were broken by Moses Mosop in June 2011. On April 20, 1981, Seko shaved one second off Bill Rodgers's course record at the Boston Marathon.

, Seko is a coach at the S & B Foods Track Team, and a member of the Tokyo 2016 Olympics Advisory Panel.

He serves on the Tokyo Metropolitan Government Board of Education from December 21, 2007.

He was devoted to the sport above other interests and once remarked "The marathon is my only girlfriend. I give her everything I have."

International competitions

Marathons

See also 
 List of winners of the Boston Marathon

References 

1956 births
Living people
Sportspeople from Mie Prefecture
Japanese male long-distance runners
Japanese male marathon runners
Olympic male marathon runners
Olympic athletes of Japan
Athletes (track and field) at the 1984 Summer Olympics
Athletes (track and field) at the 1988 Summer Olympics
Asian Games bronze medalists for Japan
Asian Games medalists in athletics (track and field)
Athletes (track and field) at the 1986 Asian Games
Medalists at the 1986 Asian Games
Japan Championships in Athletics winners
Chicago Marathon male winners
Boston Marathon male winners
London Marathon male winners
World record setters in athletics (track and field)